Prakash Belawadi is an Indian theatre artist, film director, television and media personality, who's also a teacher, activist and a journalist. He hails from Bangalore. He has participated in many seminars, conferences and festivals in India and abroad. He has been a motivational speaker at events and TEDx conferences.
He is also a mentor with the founding team of BISFF (Bengaluru International Short Film Festival) since 2010.

Early life 
Belawadi was born into a family of theatre artistes in Bangalore, in the erstwhile Mysore State (now Karnataka). His father, Belavadi Nanjundaiah Narayan (1929–2003) popularly known as Makeup Nani, was a personality in Kannada theatre, who also appeared in films, and worked as a make-up artist alongside. His mother, Bhargavi Narayan, was a renowned film and theatre artiste. His siblings Sujata, Sudha and Pradeep, and nieces and nephews are also variously connected with theatre, music, television and cinema. He completed his elementary education at Mahila Seva Samaja, higher school education in National High School, following which he completed his pre-university course at National College, Bangalore. He obtained a degree in mechanical engineering from University Visvesvaraya College of Engineering in 1983,

Awards 

 Prakash Belawadi's debut film Stumble, which he wrote and directed, won the National Award for Best Film in the English language, 2003.
 He was conferred ‘Pratibha Bhushan’ in 2003 by the Government of Karnataka for his contribution to culture.
 He was recipient of Karnataka Nataka Academy Award (2011–12) for his contribution to English and Kannada-language theatre, and
 He was awarded the ‘Pride of Karnataka’ by Bangalore Round Table (2015),.
 He was the ‘Varshada Kannadiga’ (2015) in the field of entertainment, conferred by News 18 Kannada.
 He was given Helpmann Award, Australia (2019) for Best Actor, Male in the play 'Counting and Cracking', Belvoir St. Theatre, Sydney".

International 
Belawadi as mentioned earlier has participated in many seminars, conferences and festivals in India and abroad, including the Beyond Bollywood conference at the Gothenburg International Film Festival, 2010  the Performing Arts Market conference in Seoul, 2011  the 50th Theatertreffen – annual theatre festival meet at Berlin, 2013   and the seminar and exhibition, ‘Nature – A Good Idea’ at Trollhättan, Sweden in 2014. He has been faculty for film courses in Sweden and Istanbul, Turkey.

Partial filmography

Films

As actor

Television

As director 
His debut film feature has now been included in the national telecaster Doordarshan's Best of Indian Cinema series. 
The serial ‘Garva’, which he wrote and directed in 2001 is still considered a classic among Kannada serials.

But Belawadi believes he belongs to the stage.

Activism 
Belawadi is one of the founding members of Citizens for Bengaluru, an active platform for people to engage with the city government to make it accountable to citizens. Belawadi curates ‘Rotary Avani’,  an annual ecology festival in Bengaluru between 22 April, International Mother Earth Day and 5 June, World Environment Day, to create awareness about the environment, in The Five Elements – Earth, Water, Fire, Air and Sky, so that people, together with government, industry, business and citizens can participate in initiatives to improve urban ecological health.

References

External links 

 

Living people
Kannada Brahmins
Kannada film directors
Male actors from Bangalore
Male actors in Kannada cinema
Indian male film actors
Activists from Karnataka
Journalists from Karnataka
University Visvesvaraya College of Engineering alumni
21st-century Indian male actors
Film directors from Bangalore
Indian male television actors
Male actors in Malayalam cinema
Male actors in Hindi cinema
Male actors in Tamil cinema
Year of birth missing (living people)
Male actors in Telugu cinema